Alphons (Latinized Alphonsus, Adelphonsus, or Adefonsus) is a male given name recorded from the 8th century (Alfonso I of Asturias, r. 739–757) in the Christian successor states of the Visigothic kingdom in the Iberian peninsula. In the later medieval period it became a standard name in the Hispanic and Portuguese royal families.

It is derived from a Gothic name, or a conflation of several Gothic names; from *Aþalfuns, composed of the elements aþal "noble" and funs "eager, brave, ready", and perhaps influenced by names such as *Alafuns, *Adefuns and *Hildefuns.
It is recorded as Adefonsus in the 9th and 10th century, 
and as Adelfonsus, Adelphonsus in the 10th to 11th. The reduced form Alfonso is recorded in the late 9th century, and the Portuguese form Afonso from the early 11th. and Anfós in Catalan from the 12th Century until the 15th. 

Variants of the name include: Alonso (Spanish), Alfonso (Spanish and Italian), Alfons (Dutch, German, Catalan, Polish, Croatian and Scandinavian), Afonso (Portuguese and Galician),  Alphonse, Alfonse (Italian, French and English), etc.

Middle Ages

Iberian royal families
Asturias/Leon/Castile/Spain
Alfonso I of Asturias (739-757)
Alfonso II of Asturias (791-842)
Alfonso III of León (866-910)
Alfonso Fróilaz (925-926)
Alfonso IV of León (925-931)
Alfonso V of León (999-1028)
Alfonso VI of León (1065–1109)
Alfonso VII of León (1126–1157)
Alfonso VIII of Castile (1158–1214)
Alfonso IX of León (1188–1230)
Alfonso X of Castile (1252–1284)
Alfonso XI of Castile (1312–1350)
Aragon & Naples
Alfonso I of Aragon (1104–1134), known as el Batallador (The Battler)
Alfonso II of Aragon (1162–1196)
Alfonso III of Aragon (1285–1291)
Alfonso IV of Aragon (1327–1336)
Alfonso V of Aragon (1416–1458), also king of Naples and Sicily
Alfonso II of Naples (1448–1495)
Portugal
Afonso I of Portugal (1109–1185)
Afonso II of Portugal (1185–1223)
Afonso III of Portugal (1210–1279)
Afonso IV of Portugal (1291–1357)
Afonso V of Portugal (1432–1481)
Afonso VI of Portugal (1643–1683)

Other
Alfonso Jordan (1103–1148) 
Alphonse, Count of Poitiers (1220–1271)
Alfonso of Valladolid (c. 1270 – c. 1347), Jewish convert to Christianity, philosopher, and mathematician
Alphonso, Earl of Chester (1273–1284), first son of Edward I of England, named after his godfather Alfonso X of Castile; died in childhood
Juan Alfonso de Baena (c. 1375 – c. 1434), Castilian troubadour

Early modern period
Afonso de Albuquerque, Portuguese general and governor of India
Alphonse Daudet, French novelist and historian
Alfonso I d'Este, Duke of Ferrara during the time of the War of the League of Cambrai
Afonso VI of Portugal (1656–1683)
Nzinga Mbemba (1505–1543), also known as "Afonso I of Kongo" 
Afonso II of Kongo (1561)
Alphonse de Tonty, Baron de Paludy (c. 1659 – 1727)
Afonso III of Kongo (1666–1667)
Afonso, 1st Duke of Braganza, son of John I of Portugal
Afonso, Prince of Portugal, son of John II of Portugal
Afonso, Duke of Porto, son of Louis I of Portugal
Afonso of Portugal, Lord of Portalegre, son of Afonso III of Portugal
Araribóia, baptismal name Martim Afonso, leader of the Temiminó tribe in Brazil in the 16th century
Cardinal Afonso of Portugal, son of Manuel I of Portugal
João Afonso de Aveiro, Portuguese explorer
Jorge Afonso, Portuguese Renaissance painter
Madragana, baptismal name Mor Afonso, mistress to Afonso III of Portugal
Alfonso II d'Este, Duke of Ferrara from 1559 to 1597
Alfonso II, Count of Provence, second son of Alfonso II of Aragon
Alfonso III d'Este, Duke of Modena and Reggio (1628–44)
Alfonso of Castile, Prince of Asturias, figurehead of rebelling magnates against his brother King Henry IV of Castile
Alfonso of Hauteville, Prince of Capua
Alphonsus Liguori, Roman Catholic theologian (1696–1787)
Joseph-Alphonse Esménard (1770–1811)

Modern period

Iberian/Sicilian nobility
Prince Alfonso, Count of Caserta   (1841–1934), duke of Calabria and head of the royal house of the Two Sicilies
Alfonso XII of Spain (1857–1885) (ordinal numbering continues from the kings of Castile)
Alfonso XIII of Spain (1886–1931)
Infante Alfonso, Duke of Calabria, claimant to the title of the head of House of Bourbon Two Sicilies
Alfonso of Spain, Prince of Asturias, heir-apparent of the throne of Spain 1907–31
Prince Alfonso of Hohenlohe-Langenburg (1924–2003), Spanish playboy and businessman
Infante Alfonso of Spain, younger brother of former King Juan Carlos of Spain
Fadrique Alfonso of Castile, fifth illegitimate child of Alfonso XI of Castile
Afonso VII of Portugal, future regnal name of the heir apparent to the current pretender
Infante Afonso, Prince of Beira, 2nd claimant in line to the Portuguese throne

Alfons
Alfons Almi (1904-1991), Finnish opera singer and administrator
Alfons van Blaaderen (born 1963), Dutch physicist
Alfons Geleyns (1887-1914), Belgian private
Alfons Goppel (1905–1991), German politician
Alfons Gorbach (1898–1972), Austrian politician
Alfons Jēgers (1919–1999), Latvian football and hockey player
Alfons Karpiński (1875–1961), Polish painter
Alfons Rebane (1908–1976), Estonian military commander
Alfons Rissberger (born 1948), German author

Alphonse
Alphonse Gabriel Capone (1899-1947), Chicago gangster

Alfonso
Alfonso Cuarón, Mexican cinematographer
Alfonso Calderon (activist), Spanish born activist and advocate for gun control
Alfonso Calderón (poet), Chilean poet and writer
Alfonso Soriano, American baseball player
Alfonso Lizarazo, Colombian host and politician
Alfonso Mejia-Arias, Mexican musician, writer, social activist and politician of Roma origin (Gitano)
Alfonso Ribeiro, Caribbean-American actor and game show host.
Alfonso John Romero, American video-game designer, programmer, and developer
Alfonso Pérez, Spanish football (soccer) striker
Alfonso Oiterong, Palauan statesman, former Palau vice president 1981-1985
Alicia Alfonso (born 1963), Uruguayan actress
Giovanni Alfonso Borelli, Italian physiologist and physicist
José Alfonso Belloso y Sánchez (1873–1938), Archbishop of San Salvador, El Salvador
Miguel Alfonso Pérez Aracil, Spanish football (soccer) midfielder

Afonso
Afonso Alves, Brazilian footballer
Nadir Afonso Rodrigues (1920-2013), Portuguese painter
Zeca Afonso, real name José Manuel Cerqueira Afonso dos Santos, Portuguese folk and political musician
Alexandre Afonso da Silva, Brazilian footballer
Paulo Afonso Evangelista Vieira, Brazilian politician

Alfonse
Alfonse D'Amato (born 1937), United States Senator from New York
Abraham Alfonse Albert Gallatin (1761–1849), Swiss-American politician
Alphonse Mucha (1860-1939), Czech artist

Alphonso
Alphonso Davies, Canadian footballer born in Ghana, who grew up in Edmonton

As a surname

Alphonse, Alphonso, Alfonso is occasionally seen as a surname derived from the given name, the latter descending from Asturias and Cantabria.
Celestino Alfonso (1916-1944), Spanish republican and volunteer fighter in the French resistance during World War II
Roland Alphonso (1931–1998), Jamaican saxophonist
Kristian Alfonso (born 1963), Puerto Rican American soap opera actress
Michael Lee Alfonso (1965-2007), ring name "Mike Awesome", American professional wrestler
Equis Alfonso, known as X-Alfonso, Cuban hip-hop and afro-rock musician
Ozzie Alfonso, Cuban-American TV director and producer
Andrey Nazário Afonso, Brazilian football goalkeeper
Amila Aponso, Sri Lankan Sinhala cricketer who plays for Ragama Cricket Club
Flavian Aponso, Sri Lankan Sinhala Dutch cricketer
Jayasekara Aponso, Sri Lankan Sinhala artist, actor, director, scriptwriter
Sadda Vidda Rajapakse Palanga Pathira Ambakumarage Ranjan Leo Sylvester Alphonsu, Sri Lankan Sinhala politician, actor, singer, writer

Pseudonym
Bill Alfonso, ring name of William Matthew Sierra, former professional wrestling referee & manager

Stage name
Alfons, the stage name of Emmanuel Peterfalvi, a French comedian

Fictional characters
Alphonso, protagonist in Alfonso und Estrella, an opera by Franz Schubert
Don Alfonso, character in Mozart's opera Così fan tutte
Alphonso MacKenzie, fictional character in the Marvel Universe
Alfie Atkins, known as Alfons Åberg in Swedish, character created by Gunilla Bergström from Sweden
Alfonzo Dominico Jones, a dog in the Australian television series SeaChange
Alphonse "Big Boy" Caprice, character in the comic strip Dick Tracy
Alphonse and Gaston, French duo in a comic strip created by Frederick Burr Opper
Alphonse Elric from Fullmetal Alchemist
Alphonse Mephisto, fictional character in the animated television series South Park
Alfons Heiderich from Fullmetal Alchemist the Movie: Conqueror of Shamballa
Alphonso Ali, minor character in Bloom County
Monsieur Alfonse, character in the BBC sitcom Allo 'Allo! played by the actor Kenneth Connor
The name of a number of pets and the Patlabor of Noa Izumi from the anime Patlabor
Oren Pierre Alfonso from Kamen Rider Gaim
 Alfonso "French" Sosa, a main character from The OA

See also
Ildefonso (disambiguation)

References

Italian masculine given names
Spanish masculine given names
Portuguese masculine given names